The Oakdale Handicap was an American Thoroughbred horse race run in twenty-four years between 1902 and 1932 at Aqueduct Racetrack in Ozone Park, New York. A six furlong event run in the fall, it was open for two-year-old horses of either sex. Fillies won it in 1905, 1924, and 1927.

Historical notes
First run on November 7, 1902, the distance for that year only was set at seven furlongs. It was won by Lyman Hay, a colt owned by Charles Ellison and trained by John Mayberry. The owner and trainer had hoped Lyman Hay might be a "Derby" horse for 1903. He was not, but as luck would have it they had Judge Himes in their stable with which they would win the 1903 Kentucky Derby.

Hart-Agnew Law interruption
The 1908 passage of the Hart-Agnew anti-betting legislation by the New York Legislature under Republican Governor Charles Evans Hughes led to a state-wide shutdown of racing in 1911 and 1912.  A February 21, 1913 ruling by the New York Supreme Court, Appellate Division saw horse racing return in 1913. However, the Oakdale Handicap was not restored to the track's schedule until 1917.

Grey Lag's loss
The biggest upset in the history of the Oakdale occurred in 1920 when J. D. Mooney rode Knobbie to victory over Grey Lag. A recent purchase by trainer Sam Hildreth for the Rancocas Stable, Grey Lag's career would see him earn four National Champion titles, including American Horse of the Year, and induction into the U.S. Racing Hall of Fame.

A casualty of the Great Depression
The Wall Street Crash of 1929 marked the beginning of the Great Depression, the effects of which saw racetrack owners and all businesses across the United States scrambling to reduce costs to prevent closing.  Aqueduct Racetrack would begin shuffling its races to cut purse money for some in order to enhance it for others. While the September 18, 1929 Oakdale was modified to claiming race status, it maintained its purse money until the economic downturn became so severe they had to cut the purse for the 1931 edition by 35% and for 1932 that new lower amount was cut in half. Still not enough to ensure the track's survival, the Oakdale had to be dropped from the fall schedule.

Records
Speed record:
 1:12.00 @ 6 furlongs: Ray Jay (1921)
 1:12.00 @ 6 furlongs: Sarazen (1923)
 1:12.00 @ 6 furlongs: Teheran (1926)

Most wins by a jockey:
 no jockey won this race more than once.

Most wins by a trainer:
 5 - James E. Fitzsimmons  (1920, 1921, 1924, 1927, 1931)

Most wins by an owner:
 2 - Harry Payne Whitney (1907, 1930)
 2 - Quincy Stable (James Francis Johnson) (1920, 1921)
 2 - Belair Stud Stable (1924, 1931)

Winners

References

Discontinued horse races in New York City
Aqueduct Racetrack
Open sprint category horse races
Recurring sporting events established in 1902
Recurring sporting events disestablished in 1933